The men's pommel horse competition was one of eight events for male competitors in artistic gymnastics at the 1992 Summer Olympics in Barcelona. The qualification and final rounds took place on July 27, 29 and August 2 at the Palau d'Esports de Barcelona. There were 93 competitors from 25 nations, with nations in the team event having 6 gymnasts while other nations could have up to 3 gymnasts. For the third consecutive Games, the pommel horse ended in a tie for the gold medal. Belarusian Vitaly Scherbo (on the Unified Team) and North Korean Pae Gil-su shared the top place. It was North Korea's first medal in the event. Bronze went to Andreas Wecker of Germany.

Background

This was the 18th appearance of the event, which is one of the five apparatus events held every time there were apparatus events at the Summer Olympics (no apparatus events were held in 1900, 1908, 1912, or 1920). Three of the eight finalists from 1988 returned: sixth-place finisher Daisuke Nishikawa of Japan and seventh-place finisher Sven Tippelt and eighth-place finisher Sylvio Kroll of East Germany (now competing for unified Germany). The world championships earlier in 1992 had resulted in a three-way tie between Li Jing (China), Vitaly Scherbo (Unified Team), and Pae Gil-su (North Korea).

Puerto Rico and Slovenia each made their debut in the men's pommel horse; some former Soviet Republics competed as the Unified Team. The United States made its 16th appearance, most of any nation; the Americans had missed only the inaugural 1896 pommel horse and the boycotted 1980 Games.

Competition format

Each nation entered a team of six gymnasts or up to three individual gymnasts. All entrants in the gymnastics competitions performed both a compulsory exercise and a voluntary exercise for each apparatus. The scores for all 12 exercises were summed to give an individual all-around score. These exercise scores were also used for qualification for the apparatus finals. The two exercises (compulsory and voluntary) for each apparatus were summed to give an apparatus score. The top eight gymnasts, with a limit of two per nation, advanced to the final. In a change from previous years, the preliminary score had no effect on the final; once the eight finalists were selected, their ranking depended only on the final exercise. Non-finalists were ranked 9th through 93rd based on preliminary score.

Schedule

All times are Central European Summer Time (UTC+2)

Results

Ninety-three gymnasts competed in the pommel horse event during the compulsory and optional rounds on July 27 and 29. The eight highest scoring gymnasts advanced to the final on August 2. Each country was limited to two competitors in the final.

References

Official Olympic Report
www.gymnasticsresults.com

Men's pommel horse
Men's 1992
Men's events at the 1992 Summer Olympics